Flying Elephants is a two-reel silent film from 1928 directed by Frank Butler and produced by Hal Roach. It stars Stan Laurel and Oliver Hardy as a pair of battling cavemen.

Plot
The film takes place in the Stone Age, where the King of the cave people declares that all the males between 13 and 99 years of age must find a female mate or face banishment. Hardy starts looking for a wife and in the scene it says "anyones will do" but is constantly clubbed on the head by the annoyed "husbands" Eventually Hardy finds an available girl but doesn't realize that Laurel, with whom he has become friends, is already intending to marry this girl.

As both Laurel and Hardy pursue the same girl, this eventually leads to several contests to win the affections of the young bride-to-be. Laurel leads Hardy to the top of a mountain with the intention of pushing his rival to his death. His plan ends up failing, until an angry goat rams Hardy over the cliff, allowing Laurel to go claim the girl.

Cast

Production and distribution
Although released in February 1928, Flying Elephants was actually filmed in May 1927, before the duo were established as a comedy team. As a result, the film lacks the Laurel and Hardy trademarks and consists mostly of solo performances by the two comedians.

Taking place entirely outdoors, the rocky desert locations were photographed in Moapa, Nevada. Some locations would later be used in 1940 for Hal Roach's prehistoric drama One Million B.C..

The title Flying Elephants refers to a scene where Hardy's character points out three animated pachyderms flying up above in the sky.

References

External links 

 

1928 films
1928 comedy films
American silent short films
American black-and-white films
Laurel and Hardy (film series)
Films about cavemen
Films with screenplays by H. M. Walker
1928 short films
American comedy short films
1920s American films
Silent American comedy films